The Gros fronton was a short fronton constructed in 1938 by the San Sebastián Municipality on the Gran Avenida street. The modalities played in the fronton were hand-pelota, paleta and short Xístera.
The fronton was demolished in 1961.

Championships

1st Hand-Pelota singles championship

1st Hand-Pelota doubles championship

References

Fronton (court)
Basque pelota
Sports venues in the Basque Country (autonomous community)
Sport in San Sebastián
Defunct sports venues in Spain
1938 establishments in Spain
1961 disestablishments in Spain
Sports venues completed in 1938
Sports venues demolished in 1961